Nagercoil Sudalaimuthu Krishnan, popularly known as Kalaivanar and also as NSK, was an Indian actor-comedian, theatre artist, playback singer and writer in the early stages of the Tamil film industry – in the 1940s and 1950s. He is considered as the "Charlie Chaplin of India."

Born in Ozhuginachery, Nagercoil, in the princely state of Travancore, India on 29 November 1908, his stage and cine-screen comedy performances were unique and always carried a message for the people. "Kalaivanar" N. S. Krishnan died at the age of 48, on 30 August 1957.

Personal life
He was married to actress T. A. Madhuram. His grandson NSK Rajan has acted in the film Nagareega Komaali (2006). His granddaughters Anu Vardhan and Ramya NSK are working as costume designer and playback singer in the film industry respectively.

Death 
N.S. Krishnan had been undergoing treatment for hepatitis since 12 August 1957. He died at the General Hospital, Madras on 30 August 1957 following complications of the disease.

Legacy
 The leading Tamil Nadu politician and Chief Minister of Tamil Nadu 'Kalaignar' Karunanidhi, when asked once by a journalist (of the Tamil magazine Kumudham) about who the non-political hero in his life was, answered it was Kalaivanar. Karunanidhi knew him well and worked in some of his film projects.
 Kalaivanar was an active member of the Dravidian Movement. Kalaivanar Arangam (or Kalaivanar Arts Centre) was named after him. The building is one of the leading landmarks in the city of Chennai, the capital of Tamil Nadu. It now houses the Tamil Nadu Assembly.

Filmography

References

External links
 

People from Nagercoil
People from Kanyakumari district
Tamil comedians
Tamil film directors
Dravidian movement
Anti-Brahminism
1957 deaths
1908 births
20th-century Indian film directors
20th-century Indian male actors
Tamil screenwriters
Screenwriters from Tamil Nadu
Indian male comedians
Male actors from Tamil Nadu
Indian male stage actors
Male actors in Telugu cinema
20th-century comedians
20th-century Indian screenwriters